Levenov Point (‘Levenov Nos’ \le-'ve-nov 'nos\) is the rock-tipped point on the northeast coast of Pasteur Peninsula on Brabant Island in the Palmer Archipelago, Antarctica, formed by an offshoot of Röntgen Peak.

The point is named after Captain Nikola Levenov (1941-2007), commander of the Bulgarian ocean fishing trawler Burevestnik that operated in Antarctic waters off Kerguelen Islands from December 1974 to February 1975, and of the fishing trawler Ofelia in South Georgia waters during its fishing trip from September 1977 to April 1978. The Bulgarian fishermen of the company Ocean Fisheries – Burgas, along with those of the Soviet Union, Poland and East Germany are the pioneers of modern Antarctic fishing industry.”

Location
British mapping in 1980 and 2008.

Maps
 Antarctic Digital Database (ADD). Scale 1:250000 topographic map of Antarctica. Scientific Committee on Antarctic Research (SCAR). Since 1993, regularly upgraded and updated.
British Antarctic Territory. Scale 1:200000 topographic map. DOS 610 Series, Sheet W 64 62. Directorate of Overseas Surveys, Tolworth, UK, 1980.
Brabant Island to Argentine Islands. Scale 1:250000 topographic map. British Antarctic Survey, 2008.

Notes

References
 Bulgarian Antarctic Gazetteer. Antarctic Place-names Commission. (details in Bulgarian, basic data in English)
 Levenov Point. SCAR Composite Antarctic Gazetteer.

External links
 Levenov Point. Copernix satellite image

Headlands of the Palmer Archipelago
Ocean Fisheries – Burgas Co
Bulgaria and the Antarctic